Nicks Lake is a lake located south-southwest of Old Forge, New York. Fish species present in the lake are brook trout, brown trout, white sucker, rainbow trout, yellow perch, and black bullhead. There is a state owned beach launch at the Nick's Lake State Campgroung. No motors are allowed on Nicks Lake.

References 

Lakes of New York (state)
Lakes of Herkimer County, New York